The International Association of People-Environment Studies (IAPS), has been promoting the interdisciplinary exchange of ideas between planning and social scientists for 35 years – above all between spatial planning, architecture, psychology, and sociology. IAPS was officially founded in 1981, although its origins can be traced back to a series of successful conferences in several European countries from 1969 to 1979.

The objectives of IAPS are:
To facilitate communication among those concerned with the relationships between people and their physical environment
To stimulate research and innovation for improving human well-being and the physical environment
To promote the integration of research, education, policy and practice

People-environment studies, originating from environmental psychology (Lewin, Barker, Brunswik), have always tried to close the "mind gaps" between natural sciences, engineering, arts, and social sciences by an epistemological approach that encompasses denotations (objects and techniques) as well as connotations (subjective social, cultural meanings).

Membership
Benefits of membership include:
  The right to vote and stand for membership of the Board
 Reduced fees for attending conferences and seminars
 Free copies of the IAPS newsletter. This contains research summaries, articles, reviews, letters, lists of references, and general news of the research field
 The right to be listed in and receive a copy of the Directory of IAPS members
 Reduced subscription rates for specified journals

List of conferences
The biannual conference is the main event organised under auspices of the association. In the past years, the following conferences have been organised:

Post conference books 
People, Places, and Sustainability (2002)  Editors: Moser, G. / Pol, E. / Bernard, Y. / Bonnes, M. / Corraliza, J.A. / Giuliani, V.
Culture, Quality of Life and Globalization – Problems and Challenges for the New Millennium (2003)  Editors: García Mira, R. / Sabucedo Cameselle, J.M. / Martínez, J.R.
 Designing Social Innovation - Planning, Building, Evaluating (2005)  Editors: Martens, B. / Keul, A.G.
 Environment, Health, and Sustainable Development (2010)  Editors: Abdel-Hadi, A. / Tolba, M.K. / Soliman, S.

IAPS Digital Library 
A database of all 4,400 abstracts from conferences since 1969, which permits a full-text search through the history of environmental psychology.

References

External links
Homepage of IAPS
Homepage of the IAPS Digital Library

Environmental psychology
Environmental social science
International environmental organizations

de:Umweltpsychologie
fr:Psychologie environnementale